The North Hills League is a high school athletic league.  It is part of the CIF Southern Section. Members are located in Orange County and are part of the Century Conference which is composed of team that were previously part of the Century League.

Members
 Brea Olinda High School	
 El Dorado High School
 El Modena High School
 Esperanza High School
 Foothill High School (Football, Track and Field, Wrestling and Boys Volleyball only)	
 Villa Park High School
 Yorba Linda High School

References

CIF Southern Section leagues